The galah (Eolophus roseicapilla), also known as the pink and grey cockatoo or rose-breasted cockatoo, is the only species within genus Eolophus of the cockatoo family. Found throughout Australia, it is among the most common of the cockatoos. With its distinctive pink and grey plumage and its bold and loud behaviour, it is a familiar sight in the wild and increasingly in urban areas. It has benefited from the change in the landscape since European colonisation, and appears to be replacing the Major Mitchell's cockatoo in parts of its range.

Etymology
The term galah is derived from gilaa, a word from the Yuwaalaraay and neighbouring Aboriginal languages spoken in north-western New South Wales.

Description

It has a pale silver to grey back, a pale grey rump, a pink face and breast, and a light pink mobile crest. It has a bone-coloured beak, and the bare skin of the eye ring is carunculated. It has grey legs. The sexes appear similar; however, adult birds differ in the colour of the irises; the male has very dark brown (almost black) irises and the female has mid-brown or red irises. Adults are more brightly coloured than juveniles. Juveniles have a greyish breast, crown, and crest, and brown irises with whitish non-carunculated eye rings.

Distribution and habitat
The galah can be found throughout Australia, and is absent only from the driest areas and the far north of Cape York Peninsula. The galah has been introduced to Tasmania through anthropogenic means and there were no sightings prior to 1848. A large population expansion occurred in the 1960s following many escapees from captivity. It is common in metropolitan areas such as Adelaide, Perth, and Melbourne, and abundant in open habitats that offer at least some scattered trees for shelter. It is common in all habitats in its range except for dense forests, especially those with high rainfall.

While it is mostly found in inland areas, the galah is rapidly colonising coastal regions. The changes brought by European settlement, which have been disastrous for many species, have been highly beneficial for the galah, because of the clearing of forests in fertile areas and the provision of stock-watering points in arid zones.

Classification
The classification of the galah was difficult. It was separated in the monotypic genus Eolophus, but the further relationships were not clear. Obvious morphological similarities are shared between the galah and the white cockatoos that make up the genus Cacatua and indeed the galah was initially described as Cacatua roseicapilla. Early DNA studies allied the galah with the cockatiel or placed it close to some Cacatua species of completely different appearance. In consequence, the ancestors of the galah, the cockatiel and Major Mitchell's cockatoo were thought to have diverged from the main white cockatoo line at some stage prior to that group's main radiation; this was indeed correct except for the placement of the cockatiel. Ignorance of this fact, however, led to attempts to resolve the evolutionary history and prehistoric biogeography of the cockatoos, which ultimately proved fruitless because they were based on invalid assumptions to start with.

It fell to the study of Brown & Toft (1999) to compare  research and resolve the issue. Today, the galah is seen, along with Major Mitchell's cockatoo, as an early divergence from the white cockatoo lineage, which has not completely lost its ability to produce an overall pink (Major Mitchell's) or pink and grey (galah) body plumage, while already being light in colour and non-sexually dimorphic. The significance of these two (and other) characteristics shared by the Cacatuinae

Subspecies
Three subspecies are usually recognised. Slight variation exists in the colours of the plumage and in the extent of the carunculation of the eye rings among the three subspecies. The south-eastern form, E. r. albiceps, is clearly distinct from the paler-bodied Western Australian nominate subspecies, E. r. roseicapilla, although the extent and nature of the central hybrid zone remains undefined. Most pet birds outside Australia are the south-eastern form. The third form, E. r. kuhli, found right across the northern part of the continent, tends to be a little smaller and is distinguished by differences in the shape and colour of the crest, although its status as a valid subspecies is uncertain.

Behaviour 
The galah is often found in flocks of 10 to 1,000 individuals. These can be mixed flocks, the members of which may include Major Mitchell's cockatoo, the little corella, and the sulphur-crested cockatoo. The galah readily hybridizes with all of these species (see below). Flocks of galahs often congregate and forage on the ground for food in open, grassy areas. Flocks of independent juvenile galahs will often disperse from their birth flock haphazardly. The galah feeds on seeds gathered on the ground, mainly feeding in the morning and late afternoon. Idly, it will strip leaves and barks from trees, and large flocks have been observed to kill trees through defoliation.

Breeding

The galah nests in tree cavities. The eggs are white, usually two to five in a clutch. The eggs are incubated for about 25 days, and the male and female share the incubation. The chicks leave the nest about 49 days after hatching.

Lifespan
Living in captivity, galahs have been recorded reaching up to 72 years of age when a good-quality diet is strictly followed. They socialise adequately and can engage playfully in entertainment activities to support the overall very intelligent nature of the bird. In their natural habitat, galahs are unlikely to reach the age of 20 years, falling victim to traffic, predators such as the little eagle and black and peregrine falcons, and human activities in some agricultural areas.  Like most other cockatoos, galahs create strong, lifelong bonds with their partners.

Hybrids
The galah readily hybridizes with several species, including the sulphur-crested cockatoo, little corella, Major Mitchell's cockatoo, and the cockatiel. Galah x cockatiel hybrids are often referred to as "galatiels". Aviary-bred hybrids of galah x Major Mitchell's cockatoo have been bred in Sydney, with the tapered wings of the galah and the crest and colours of the Major Mitchell's, as well as the plaintive cry of the latter.

Relationship to humans
In the state of South Australia, galahs are considered "unprotected native fauna" and may be shot (without a permit), trapped or gassed (with a permit) by landowners.

Aviculture
The galah is very common as a companion parrot or avicultural specimen around the world, although generally absent from Australian aviaries, although permits are available in South Australia to take a limited number of galahs from the wild per year for avicultural purposes. When tame, it can be an affectionate and friendly bird that can learn to talk, as well as mimic other sounds heard in its environment. While it is a noisy bird that may be unsuitable for apartment living, it is comparatively quieter than other cockatoo species. Like most parrots, the galah requires plenty of exercise and play time out of its cage as well as several hours of daily social interaction with humans or other birds in order to thrive in captivity. It may also be prone to obesity if not provided with a suitable, nutritionally-balanced diet. The World Parrot Trust recommends that captive galahs should be kept in an aviary with a minimum length of 7 metres.

The breeding requirements include the use of upright or tilted logs with a hollow some twenty to thirty centimetres in diameter. Sand and finer grades of wood material are used to construct their nest, the availability of eucalypt leaves for the nest lining is also suggested for captive breeding.

As food
The galah has historically been eaten by humans. Galah meat recipes were published in Australian newspapers in the 1930s, alongside jokes about the alleged toughness and unpalatable nature of the bird's flesh.

Cultural references
"Galah" is also derogatory Australian slang, synonymous with 'fool', 'clown' or 'idiot'. Because of the bird's distinctive bright pink colour, it is also used for gaudy dress. A detailed description of the Australian slang term can be found in the standup comedy performance of Paul Hogan, titled Stand Up Hoges. Another famous user of the slang "galah" is Alf Stewart from Home and Away, who is often heard saying "Flaming galah!" when he is riled by somebody.

The Australian representative team of footballers that played a series of test matches of international rules football against Irish sides in the late 1960s adopted the nickname "The Galahs" after a disparaging reference to their uniform.

Angry Birds includes a pink bird named Stella who is intended to be based on a Galah.

Namesake 

 Gulargambone, New South Wales

References

 Brown, D.M. & Toft, C.A. (1999): Molecular systematics and biogeography of the cockatoos (Psittaciformes: Cacatuidae). Auk 116(1): 141–157.
 Flegg, Jim (2002): Photographic Field Guide: Birds of Australia. Reed New Holland, Sydney & London. 
 Forshaw, Joseph M. & Cooper, William T. (2002): Australian Parrots (3rd ed.). Alexander Editions. 
 Frith, Harold James & Watts, Betty Temple (1984): Birds in the Australian High Country. Angus & Robertson, London.

Cited texts

External links

 The Australian galah: A website dedicated to galahs
 rosakakadu.com Galah-Homepage 

Cacatuini
Endemic birds of Australia
Birds of Victoria (Australia)
Talking birds
Birds described in 1817
Taxa named by Louis Jean Pierre Vieillot